Aspergillus sulphureoviridis is a species of fungus in the genus Aspergillus. It is from the Nidulantes section. The species was first described in 2016. It has been isolated from indoor air in Denmark.

Growth and morphology

A. sulphureoviridis has been cultivated on both Czapek yeast extract agar (CYA) plates and Malt Extract Agar Oxoid® (MEAOX) plates. The growth morphology of the colonies can be seen in the pictures below.

References 

sulphureoviridis
Fungi described in 2016